A hippalectryon or hippalektryon, is a type of fantastic hybrid creature of Ancient Greek folklore, half-horse (front) and half-rooster (hind), including the tail, wings and hind legs. Its colour varies between yellow and reddish. No myths related to it are currently known.

The oldest representation currently known dates back to the 9th century BCE, and the motif grows most common in the 6th century, notably in vase painting and sometimes as statues, often shown with a rider. It is also featured on some pieces of currency. A few literary works of the 5th century mention the beast, most notably Aeschylus and Aristophanes, who used it as one of his favourite insults.

The precise function of the Hippalectryon remains a mystery; as an apotropaic and prophylactic animal, it might have been dedicated to Poseidon and tasked to protect ships. Other studies interpret it as a grotesque beast to amuse children, or a simple fantastic decorative element without any specific function.

Etymology 
The term hippalectryon, also transcribed "hippalektryon", comes directly from Ancient Greek "ἱππαλεκτρυών", a compound word that comprises ἵππος (híppos, "horse"), and ἀλεκτρυών (alektryốn, "rooster"). The name is thus a plain description of the hybrid creature. The name seems to have been used for the first time by Aeschylus in Myrmidons; the comic usage made by Aristophanes suggests that by the end of the 5th Century, most of the inhabitants of Athens had never heard about the creature.

Description 

In The Birds, Aristophanes describes the hippalectryon as a yellow-feathered, awkward-looking creature. The appearance of the creature is consistent amongst the known artistic representations. It involves a horse front part, including the head, withers and the front legs; the hind part is that of a rooster, including the wings, tail and legs.

A text attributed to Hesychius of Alexandria mentions three different types of hippalectryons: a giant rooster; a giant vulture; and a creature close to griffins as painted on fabrics from Persia.  Some confusion might have arisen, as some texts also refer to hippalectryons as plain horses, a coat-of-arms,  or as sea monsters.  Before Aeschylus, no specific term appears to refer to representations of hippalectryons.

Ceramic and sculpture 

The oldest known representation of a hippalectryon is an askos from Knossos, dating back to the 9th century BCE.

Hippalectryons become a common theme from 575 to 480 BCE, often depicted with an unarmed rider, typically a young boy.

The motif might not be an ancient Greek invention: an analysis of Aristophanes' works suggests that it could have originated in the Middle East, and the costumes worn by the people featured on pottery with hippalectryons seem to be Asian, though this particular point is a matter of debate.

Hippalectryons are displayed almost exclusively on black-figure vases from Attica, and could constitute an alternative representation of Pegasus.

Hybrids are a popular and common theme in archaic Greek sculpture and vase painting. Most hybrids appear to have reached Greece from the East, although no early representation of a hippalectryon in Ancient Egyptian or Middle Eastern art has yet been found.

Hippalectryons have been found on engraved stones from the Late Period of ancient Egypt. Though they differ from 6th century Attic and Ionic representations, the horse head and the rooster legs and tail are featured.

Numismatics 
Five coins featuring a hippalectryon, or possibly Pegasus, were found in 1868 in the Volterra treasure, amongst 65 very old pieces of currency

Symbolism 
According to a study of Aristophanes' The Frogs, hippalectryons were often painted on shields. A red-figure vase featuring Athena waving a shield sporting a hippalectryon has been found; the theme probably was credited with apotropaic and prophylactic virtues. Roosters are prophylactic as they are a symbol of solar power  that routs demons with its singing at sunrise. Horses, especially winged horses, are a funerary symbol as they guide the souls of the dead. The grotesque and ugly hybrid supposedly induced laughter, thereby driving evil away.

The Hippalectryon described in Aeschylus' Myrmidons was probably sculpted to commemorate a naval high deed. In The Frogs, Aristophanes states that the motif was painted on galleys in ancient times, indicating that it could have been credited with magical powers to protect ships.

Occurrences in Greek texts 
Hippalectryons are not associated with any known myth or legend. As a consequence, they are scarcely mentioned by Greek authors.

Aeschylus is the first to mention them: in Myrmidons, he describes a ship featuring a "fire-coloured horse-chanticleer".

Hippalectryon is one of Aristophanes' favourite insults. He uses it in Peace (421 BCE), The Birds (414) and in The Frogs (405), in which Dionysus and Euripides mock Aeschylus for mentioning it. He furthermore mentions that in his time (end of the 5th century BCE), most inhabitants of Athens had never heard of hippalectryons.

In popular culture 
 Hippalectyons are seldom mentioned in modern works. There might be an occurrence in Ride a cock horse to Banbury Cross, a nursery rhyme published in  Mother Goose English translation, published in 1729: 

 Hippalektryons appear in the Percy Jackson & The Olympians series, in the fourth book,  The Battle of the Labyrinth. They are thought to be extinct, but there are some at Geryon's Ranch.

 Hippalektryons also feature in the third book of the Thrones and Bones trilogy, Skyborn, by Lou Anders. Karn and Asterius, the minotaur prince, use them to escape from the Thican soldiers at Caldera.

Notes and references

Notes

Bibliography 
 Swets and Zitlinger, « Annales de la Faculté des Lettres de Bordeaux et des Universités du Midi, quatrième série commune aux Universités d'Aix, Bordeaux, Montpellier, Toulouse », in Revue des études anciennes, t. 6, 1904.
 W. Geoffrey Arnott, Birds in the ancient world from A to Z, Routledge, 2007 .
 Juan Eduardo Cirlot, Jack Sage et Herbert Read, A dictionary of symbols, Routledge, 1993 .

External links

 Hippalektryon on  Theoi
  Hippalektryon by Harvey Alan Shapiro :  Art, Myth, and Culture, Greek Vases from Southern Collections on Perseus gallery,
  Hippalektryøn on Summagallicana

Greek legendary creatures
Heraldic beasts
Horses in mythology
Mythological hybrids
Winged horses
Mythological galliforms